The Ethiopian First League (Amharic: የኢትዮጵያ አንደኛ ሊግ) is the third division of Ethiopian football. The league is run by the Ethiopian Football Federation.

Teams

2021-22 Season 
The 2021-22 (2013 E.C.) edition of the league, 48 clubs were split into three different groups each in a designated host city.

Group 1: Host City - Wolaita Sodo and Bishoftu

Group 2: Host City - Burayu and Welkite

Group 3: Host City - Asella and Burayu

References 

Football leagues in Ethiopia